Black sheep is an idiom used to describe an odd or disreputable member of a group, especially within a family.

Black sheep may also refer to:

Film
 The Black Sheep (1920 film), British silent film directed by Sidney Morgan
 Black Sheep (1935 film), American romantic drama film directed by Allan Dwan
 The Black Sheep (1960 film), German film
 The Black Sheep (1968 film), Italian comedy film starring Vittorio Gassman
 Baa Baa Black Sheep (1976-1978 TV series), an American television series
 The Black Sheep (1992 film), also known as Le Mouton noir, a documentary film directed by Jacques Godbout
 Black Sheep (1996 film), American comedy film starring Chris Farley and David Spade
 Black Sheep (2006 New Zealand film), New Zealand horror comedy film by Jonathan King
 Black Sheep (2006 German film), German comedy film directed by Oliver Rihs
 Black Sheep (2016), web series created by Stray Factory
  Black Sheep (2018 film), British documentary short film about black teen Cornelius and his family

Literature
 Die schwarzen Schafe (translated as Black Sheep), a prize-winning story by Heinrich Böll 1951
 Black Sheep (Heyer novel), a 1966 novel by Georgette Heyer
 Black Sheep (play), a 2001 play by Lee Blessing
 La Rabouilleuse (The Black Sheep), an 1842 novel by Honoré de Balzac
 Black Sheep, novel by Na'ima B. Robert
 Black Sheep (Hill novel), a 2013 novella by Susan Hill

Music

Performers
 Black Sheep (anarcho-folk band), an English band formed by Julian Cope
 Black Sheep (duo), an American hip hop duo
 Black Sheep (metal band), a 1980s American band fronted by Willie Basse
 Black Sheep (rock band), a 1970s American band featuring Lou Gramm
 The Black Sheep Band, a Chicago-based punk supergroup that cut one album for charity
 The BlackSheeps, a Norwegian punk band
 Beowülf, originally Black Sheep, an American crossover thrash band

Albums
 Black Sheep (Julian Cope album), 2008
 Black Sheep (Nat & Alex Wolff album), 2011
 Black Sheep (Ra album), 2009
 Black Sheep, a 1996 album by Martin Sexton
 Black Sheep (EP), a 2019 EP by Dean Brody

Song
 "Black Sheep" (John Anderson song), 1983
 "Black Sheep", a song by Sonata Arctica on their 2001 album Silence
 "Black Sheep", a song by Sneaker Pimps on their 2002 album Bloodsport 
 "Black Sheep", a song by Nellie McKay in the 2005 film Rumor Has It...
 "Black Sheep", a song by August Burns Red on their 2007 album Messengers
 "Black Sheep", a song by Metric in the 2010 film Scott Pilgrim vs. the World
 "Black Sheep" (Gin Wigmore song), 2011
 "One Black Sheep", a song by Mat Kearney on his 2015 album Just Kids
 "Black Sheep" (Dean Brody song), 2019

Military
 The Black Sheep, a name for VMA-214, a United States Marine Corps fighter squadron
 8th Fighter Squadron, a former United States Air Force unit

Other
 Abigail's Black Sheep, a pro wrestler in the Wyatt Family who wears a black sheep mask
 Black Sheep Brewery, a British ale-maker
 Black Sheep Productions, a Filipino motion picture company
 Cwmni y Ddafad Ddu Gymreig Cyfyngedig ("Welsh Black Sheep Company Limited"), which issued private banknotes between June 1969 and 1972
 Kuroi Hitsuji (literally "Black sheep") is the 8th single from Japanese idol group Keyakizaka46.
 "Black Sheep of the Family", a 1999 television episode of Cow and Chicken

See also
 
 Baa, Baa, Black Sheep (disambiguation)
 Black sheep effect, a concept in group dynamics
 Kara Koyunlu or Black Sheep Turkomans, a 14th- and 15th-century Turkmen tribal federation